Rhebas was a coastal town of ancient Bithynia located near the Euxine entrance to the Bosphorus, near the mouth of the Rhebas River.

Its site is tentatively located near Rıva in Asiatic Turkey.

References

Populated places in Bithynia
Former populated places in Turkey
History of Istanbul Province